The COVID-19 pandemic in Calabarzon is part of the worldwide pandemic of coronavirus disease 2019 caused by severe acute respiratory syndrome coronavirus 2. The virus reached Calabarzon on March 7, 2020, when the first case of the disease was confirmed in Rizal. All provinces in the region has confirmed cases. As of October 19, 2021, the region has 486,176 confirmed cases, with 5,048 deaths.

Background 

The first confirmed COVID-19 case in Calabarzon is a 62-year-old male, a resident of Cainta, Rizal, who frequented a Muslim prayer hall in San Juan, Metro Manila. The patient was admitted at the Cardinal Santos Medical Center in San Juan, Metro Manila on March 1, 2020, and was diagnosed with severe pneumonia. The case was confirmed on March 5 and the man was referred to the Research Institute for Tropical Medicine in Muntinlupa. The individual's case is also the first confirmed local transmission of COVID-19 in the country, having no travel history abroad. The patient's wife also contracted the disease.

Mayor Kit Nieto of Cainta ordered the immediate provision of face masks and disinfectants in areas near the residence of the patient. The patient's family, as well as his neighbors, were placed under quarantine. Nieto suspended classes in Cainta from March 7 to 10 and placed the city under community quarantine since March 15.

Aside from Rizal, all provinces have confirmed cases. The first case per province by date of confirmation as is as follows:
Cavite – March 10
Batangas – March 13
Laguna and Quezon – March 15; the first two cases in Quezon is from Lucena, which is geographically part of Quezon but is administered independently from the province. The first Quezon case outside Lucena is linked to the municipality of Sariaya.

Statistics

Response 
Calabarzon was under the scope of the enhanced community quarantine in Luzon imposed by the national government from March 16, 2020.

On May 16, Calabarzon (except Laguna) was downgraded to general community quarantine (GCQ).

On August 1, Lipa was placed under a 15-day lockdown and the province of Batangas was placed under GCQ. On August 4, the modified ECQ status was reinstated for Cavite, Laguna, and Rizal, all of which surround Metro Manila. On August 19, the aforementioned provinces were downgraded to GCQ.

On September 1, the entire region except for Batangas was downgraded to modified GCQ.

On March 22, 2021, in view of the grim rising of new COVID-19 cases, the GCQ status, this time with additional restrictions, was reinstated over Cavite, Laguna, and Rizal. Alongside Metro Manila and Bulacan, these areas were collectively given the designation "NCR Plus" and the restrictions placed on the area is described essentially as a GCQ-MECQ hybrid. On March 27, it was announced that "NCR Plus" would be placed under ECQ from March 29 to April 4; it would later be extended up to April 11. On April 12, the area was then downgraded to modified ECQ, while Quezon was elevated to GCQ. On May 15, the provinces under the NCR Plus bubble were downgraded to GCQ with "heightened restrictions." From June 16 to July 15, the city of Lucena was placed under MECQ. On July 1, Rizal was downgraded to normal GCQ. On July 16, Lucena was downgraded to GCQ with "heightened restrictions," while Cavite was downgraded to normal GCQ. Effective August 1 to 15, Rizal and Cavite would be upgraded back to GCQ with "heightened restrictions," while Laguna was upgraded to MECQ.

Notes

References 

Calabarzon
History of Calabarzon